Blu Radio may refer to:
BluRadio, a radio station serving northern Italy and Southern Switzerland
Bluradio, a radio station in Bogotá, Colombia